Ninna Tersman is a Swedish playwright, dramaturg and translator. She has written more than twenty plays, and has won the Critic's Prize for Best Production of the Year, and the Adam NZ Play Award.

Work 
Tersman has written more than twenty plays. She also translates plays from Swedish to English. She has worked as a literary manager and dramaturg at the Riksteatern (National Touring Theatre) in Sweden. She has lived in Auckland, Sydney and Stockholm.

Awards 
In 2008 Tersman's play Fucking Parasites won the inaugural Adam NZ Play Award. The play, about two teenagers in an asylum seeker processing centre, was workshopped at the Pacific Playhouse in London, directed by Lorae Parry with script advisor Tanika Gupta. The play was then published as Parasites by Currency Press in Australia in 2017.

In 2012 Tersman won the Critic's Prize for Best Production of the Year for the play When Winter Stars Shine Down on Us.

References 

Swedish women dramatists and playwrights
21st-century Swedish dramatists and playwrights
Year of birth missing (living people)
Living people
Place of birth missing (living people)
21st-century Swedish women writers